James McQueen Anderson Smith (28 November 1901 – 9 April 1964) was a Scottish professional footballer who played as a goalkeeper for Rosyth Juniors, Rosyth Recreation, East Fife, Tottenham Hotspur, St Johnstone, Norwich City and Ayr United.

Football career 
Smith played for Rosyth Juniors and later at Rosyth Recreation before joining East Fife. In 1925 he signed for Tottenham Hotspur where he played in a total of 31 matches in all competitions. After leaving White Hart Lane, Smith had spells at St Johnstone and Norwich City where he made a further 31 appearances before ending his football career at Ayr United.

References 

1901 births
1964 deaths
People from Leith
Footballers from Fife
Scottish footballers
Association football goalkeepers
English Football League players
Scottish Football League players
East Fife F.C. players
Tottenham Hotspur F.C. players
St Johnstone F.C. players
Norwich City F.C. players
Ayr United F.C. players